Thijs Maarten van Valkengoed (born 6 July 1983 in Lelystad) is a breaststroke swimmer from the Netherlands, who competed for his native country at the 2004 Summer Olympics in Athens, Greece and the 2008 Summer Olympics in Beijing. He trains together with his sister Jolijn in their hometown.

Swimming career
Thijs debuted at the international stage during the 2002 European Aquatics Championships in Berlin. Van Valkengoed's main achievement is winning the bronze medal in the 200 m breaststroke at the European Short Course Swimming Championships 2003 in Dublin, Ireland. Earlier that month he had qualified himself for the 2004 Summer Olympics with national records in 100 m and 200 m breaststroke. At the Olympics he was eliminated in the semi finals of the 100 m breaststroke, and in the heats of the 200 m breaststroke.

Overtraining
After the disappointing results in Montreal at the 2005 World Aquatics Championships it appeared that Thijs had been overtraining himself for a longer period of time. He had to rest for the whole 2006 season.

Comeback
After his overtraining he decided to move back from Amsterdam to Lelystad and started to train with his sister with the goal to qualify themselves for the 2008 European Aquatics Championships in Eindhoven. At the end of 2007 both Thijs and Jolijn van Valkengoed reached their goal and qualified for the European Championship in their home country. During the European championships Thijs lowered his own national record at the 100 m breaststroke to 1:01.22 and instead qualified for his second Olympics. Later on his sister qualified herself for the medley relay at the 2008 Summer Olympics. Just days before the Games started, during the training-camp in Hong Kong, Thijs became ill. Due to the illness Thijs couldn't lower his national record again.

Personal bests

See also 
 Dutch records in swimming

References

 Dutch Olympic Committee

1983 births
Living people
People from Lelystad
Olympic swimmers of the Netherlands
Dutch male breaststroke swimmers
Swimmers at the 2004 Summer Olympics
Swimmers at the 2008 Summer Olympics
Sportspeople from Flevoland